Parfait Justé Nguema Ndong (born 23 July 1971) is a Gabonese former professional footballer who played as a defender.

Career
In 1995, Ndong signed for Portuguese third division side Maia from Amora in the Portuguese second division.

In 1996, he signed for Portuguese top flight club Chaves. While playing for Gabon, Ndong suffered a fractured knee, causing him to retire from professional football, before joining a team in the Swiss lower leagues.

References

External links
 

Living people
1971 births
Gabonese footballers
Association football defenders
Gabon international footballers
Petrosport F.C. players
F.C. Penafiel players
Liga Portugal 2 players
Primeira Liga players
G.D. Chaves players
F.C. Maia players
Amora F.C. players
Campeonato de Portugal (league) players
Gabonese expatriate footballers
Gabonese expatriates in Portugal
Expatriate footballers in Portugal
21st-century Gabonese people